Events from the year 1996 in Belgium

Incumbents
Monarch: Albert II
Prime Minister: Jean-Luc Dehaene

Events
 27 February – A multiple-vehicle collision occurred on the E17 near Nazareth, with 10 deaths the worst traffic accident in Belgium
 13 August – Child-murderer Marc Dutroux arrested
 20 October – White March: approximately 300,000 people demonstrate to protest police and judicial inefficiency and demand improved child protection in the wake of the Dutroux affair.

Publications
 David A. Boileau, Cardinal Mercier: A Memoir (Peeters)
 A. G. Papadopoulos, Urban Regimes and Strategies: Building Europe's Central Executive District in Brussels (University of Chicago Press)

Births

Deaths
 6 May – Leo Joseph Suenens (born 1904), cardinal
 19 May – Charles Verlinden (born 1907), historian
 29 September – Albert Ayguesparse (born 1900), writer

References

 
Belgium
Years of the 20th century in Belgium
1990s in Belgium
Belgium